Siu Hong is one of the 31 constituencies in the Tuen Mun District.

Created for the 1991 District Board elections, the constituency returns one district councillor to the Tuen Mun District Council, with an election every four years.

Siu Hong loosely covers areas surrounding Siu Hong Court in Tuen Mun with an estimated population of 15,943.

Councillors represented

Election results

2010s

References

Tuen Mun
Constituencies of Hong Kong
Constituencies of Tuen Mun District Council
1991 establishments in Hong Kong
Constituencies established in 1991